Elizabeth Weiss is an American anthropologist. She is a professor of anthropology at San Jose State University.

Education
In 1996, Weiss received a BA in anthropology from the University of California, Santa Cruz. In 1998, she received a MA in anthropology from California State University, Sacramento. In 2001, she received a PhD from the University of Arkansas in Environmental Dynamics. 

From 2002 to 2004, Weiss did post-doctoral work at the Canadian Museum of Civilization.

Career
In 2004, Weiss became a fully tenured professor at San Jose State University.

In April 2021, Weiss gave a presentation at the Society for American Archaeology virtual annual meeting titled "Has Creationism Crept Back into Archaeology?" She claimed during the presentation that NAGPRA gives control of scientific research to the religious beliefs of contemporary Native American communities.

In February 2022, Weiss sued San Jose State officials claiming that they retaliated against her for her views and restricted her from accessing skeletal remains that she was studying. She is being represented by a lawyer from the Pacific Legal Foundation.

Personal life
Weiss was married to J. Philippe Rushton.

Awards and honors
In 2019, Weiss received the College of Social Sciences’ Austen D. Warburton Award of Merit for excellence in scholarship.

Books
Reburying the Past: The Effects of Repatriation and Reburial on Scientific Inquiry (Nova Science Publishers, 2008)
Bioarchaeological Science: What we have Learned from Human Skeletal Remains (Nova Science Publishers, 2009)
Introduction to Human Evolution 2010
Paleopathology in Perspective: Bone Health and Disease through Time (Rowman & Littlefield, 2014)
Reading the Bones: Activity, Biology, and Culture (University Press of Florida, 2017)
with James W. Springer Repatriation and Erasing the Past (University Press of Florida, 2020)

References

American anthropologists
Year of birth missing (living people)
Living people
San Jose State University faculty
University of California, Santa Cruz alumni
California State University, Sacramento alumni
University of Arkansas alumni